Nikolai Nikolayevich Prokhorkin (born 17 September 1993) is a Russian professional ice hockey forward currently playing for SKA Saint Petersburg of the Kontinental Hockey League (KHL).

Playing career
He was drafted by the Los Angeles Kings, 121st overall in the 2012 NHL Entry Draft. On 5 September 2012, Prokhorkin was signed by the Kings to a three-year entry level contract. After attending the Kings training camp, Prokhorkin was assigned to American Hockey League affiliate, the Manchester Monarchs. He featured in 8 games with the Monarchs to begin the 2012–13 season, before opting to return to his original club, CSKA Moscow and terminate his contract with the Kings on 14 November 2012. In 2015 he transferred to powerhouse SKA Saint Petersburg where he won a Gagarin Cup in 2017.

On 13 May 2019, Prokhorkin as a free agent signed a one-year, entry-level contract with draft club, the Los Angeles Kings. In his lone North American season in 2019–20, Prokhorkin was originally assigned to play with the Kings' AHL affiliate, the Ontario Reign. He made 4 appearances with the Reign before he was recalled to make his long-awaited debut in the NHL. Remaining with the Kings over the course of the season, Prokhorkin collected 4 goals and 14 points in 43 games in a bottom-six role, before the season was halted due to the COVID-19 pandemic.

With the Kings out of playoff contention, and unable to participate in the return to play stage, Prokhorkin as an impending restricted free agent opted to return to his homeland, agreeing to a two-year contract with Metallurg Magnitogorsk on 20 July 2020. He was signed by Metallurg after his KHL rights' were earlier acquired from SKA Saint Petersburg in exchange for Vladislav Kamenev on 11 June 2020.

Following a lone season with Metallurg and entering the 2021–22 season, Prokhorkin was traded by Magnitogorsk to defending champions, Avangard Omsk in exchange for Denis Zernov on 30 August 2021.

On 1 May 2022, Prokhorkin as a free agent returned to former club, SKA Saint Petersburg, by signing a three-year contract.

International play
Prokhorkin is a member of the Olympic Athletes from Russia team at the 2018 Winter Olympics.

Career statistics

Regular season and playoffs

International

Awards and honors

References

External links
 

1993 births
Living people
Avangard Omsk players
HC CSKA Moscow players
Los Angeles Kings draft picks
Los Angeles Kings players
Ice hockey players at the 2018 Winter Olympics
Manchester Monarchs (AHL) players
Medalists at the 2018 Winter Olympics
Metallurg Magnitogorsk players
Olympic gold medalists for Olympic Athletes from Russia
Olympic ice hockey players of Russia
Olympic medalists in ice hockey
Ontario Reign (AHL) players
Russian ice hockey forwards
Salavat Yulaev Ufa players
SKA Saint Petersburg players
Sportspeople from Chelyabinsk